Jamie Hunter may refer to:
 Jamie Hunter (rugby union) (born 1997), Scottish rugby union footballer
 Jamie Hunter (Bonanza), a character on the TV series Bonanza
 Jamie Hunter (River City), a character on the TV series River City
 Jamie Hunter (snooker player), English cue sports player